The Robert Fitzgerald Prosody Award is awarded to scholars who have made a lasting contribution to the art and science of versification.  The award was named after the poet, critic, and translator Robert Fitzgerald. It was established in 1999 at the Fifth Annual West Chester University Poetry Conference.  Each awardee has been interviewed at the conference by linguist and literary historian Dr. Thomas Cable of the University of Texas at Austin.

Winners
 2014: Brennan O'Donnell
 2012: Charles O. Hartman
 2010: Thomas Cable
 2009: Annie Finch
 2008: Lewis Turco
 2007: Robert B. Shaw
 2006: John Hollander
 2005: Marina Tarlinskaja
 2004: Timothy Steele
 2003: George T. Wright
 2002: Paul Fussell
 2001: Edward Weismiller
 2000: T. V. F. Brogan
 1999: Derek Attridge

See also

 Poetry
 List of years in poetry
 List of poetry awards
 List of American literary awards

References
 Thomas Cable 'The Robert Fitzgerald Prosody Award' in R. S. Gwynn and April Linder (editors) The West Chester University Poetry Conference: A History, Kelly-Winterton Press, New York, 2004.

American poetry awards